A boat lift, ship lift, or lift lock is a machine for transporting boats between water at two different elevations, and is an alternative to the canal lock.

It may be vertically moving, like the Anderton boat lift in England, rotational, like the Falkirk Wheel in Scotland, or operate on an inclined plane, like the Ronquières inclined plane in Belgium.

History
A precursor to the canal boat lift, able to move full-sized canal boats, was the tub boat lift used in mining, able to raise and lower the 2.5 ton tub boats then in use. An experimental system was in use on the Churprinz mining canal in Halsbrücke near Dresden. It lifted boats  using a moveable hoist rather than caissons. The lift operated between 1789 and 1868, and for a period of time after its opening engineer James Green reporting that five had been built between 1796 and 1830. He credited the invention to Dr James Anderson of Edinburgh.

The idea of a boat lift for canals can be traced back to a design based on balanced water-filled caissons in Erasmus Darwin's Commonplace Book (pp. 58–59) dated 1777–1778

In 1796 an experimental balance lock was designed by James Fussell and constructed at Mells on the Dorset and Somerset Canal, though this project was never completed. A similar design was used for lifts on the tub boat section of the Grand Western Canal entered into operation in 1835 becoming the first non-experimental boat lifts in Britain and pre-dating the Anderton Boat Lift by 40 years.

In 1904 the Peterborough Lift Lock designed by Richard Birdsall Rogers opened in Canada.

Before the construction of the Three Gorges Dam Ship Lift, the highest boat lift, with a  height difference and European Class IV (1350 tonne) capacity, was the Strépy-Thieu boat lift in Belgium opened in 2002.

Selected lift locks

See also

 List of boat lifts
 Lock (water transport)
 Balance lock
 Canal inclined plane – another technique for lifting boats.
 Caisson lock: a submerged boat lift.
 Shiplift – used for raising vessels in shipyards
 Marine railway inclined plane for shipyards
 Water slope
 Saint-Louis-Arzviller boat lift, France – which is actually a canal inclined plane
 Portable boat lift
 Patent slip

References

Further reading

External links

  Source mentions its own sources
 The International Canal Monuments List
  Three Gorges Dam
 Big Chute, Ontario – in fact an inclined plane
 Twin Ship Elevator Lüneburg – Technical data of the Scharnebeck twin ship lift near Lüneburg, Germany
 Dutch boat lift page

 
Vertical transport devices